Willy Wo-Lap Lam (born 1952) is a Hong Kong columnist, newspaper editor, political commentator, political scientist, public policy analyst, sinologist, and writer. He is a frequent commentator on many major media networks regarding the current state of Chinese politics. He is currently a Jamestown Foundation fellow and an adjunct professor at the Centre for China Studies, Chinese University of Hong Kong.

Biography 
Lam holds a BA from University of Hong Kong in 1974, an MA from the University of Minnesota in 1978, and subsequently earned a PhD in Political Economy from Wuhan University in 2002.

Lam worked as a columnist for the South China Morning Post until 2000. He was the paper's Beijing correspondent until the 1989 Tiananmen Square protests, and was China editor during the 1997 handover of Hong Kong. In 1995, he was described as the "quintessential China watcher"; CNN called him "one of the most plugged-in observers of Chinese politics in the world" in 1999. He left the paper in December 2000 complaining of editorial censorship.

Views 
Lam was critical of the late CCP general secretary Jiang Zemin, saying that Jiang had "successfully consolidated his power" but "hasn't used that power to accomplish anything significant". 

Lam has described the direction of Chinese society under CCP general secretary Xi Jinping as "the closing of the Chinese mind".

Bibliography

References

External links
 Articles at Jamestown Foundation
 Faculty page at Chinese University of Hong Kong

1952 births
Living people
Academic staff of the Chinese University of Hong Kong
Alumni of the University of Hong Kong
Hong Kong columnists
Hong Kong journalists
Hong Kong political scientists
Hong Kong sinologists
Political economists
University of Minnesota alumni
Wuhan University alumni